The Tetraodontiformes  are an order of highly derived ray-finned fish, also called the Plectognathi. Sometimes these are classified as a suborder of the order Perciformes. The Tetraodontiformes are represented by 10 extant families and at least 349 species overall; most are marine and dwell in and around tropical coral reefs, but a few species are found in freshwater streams and estuaries. They have no close relatives, and descend from a line of coral-dwelling species that emerged around 80 million years ago.

Description
Various bizarre forms are included here, all radical departures from the streamlined body plan typical of most fishes. These forms range from nearly square or triangular (boxfishes), globose (pufferfishes) to laterally compressed (filefishes and triggerfishes).

Most members of this order – except for the family Balistidae – are ostraciiform swimmers, meaning the body is rigid and incapable of lateral flexure. Because of this, they are slow-moving and rely on their pectoral, dorsal, anal, and caudal fins for propulsion rather than body undulation. However, movement is usually quite precise; dorsal and anal fins aid in manoeuvring and stabilizing. In most species, all fins are simple, small, and rounded, except for the pelvic fins which, if present, are fused and buried. Again, in most members, the gill plates are covered over with skin, the only gill opening a small slit above the pectoral fin.

The tetraodontiform strategy seems to be defense at the expense of speed, with all species fortified with scales modified into strong plates or spines – or with tough, leathery skin (the filefishes and ocean sunfish). Another striking defensive attribute found in the pufferfishes and porcupinefishes is the ability to inflate their bodies to greatly increase their normal diameter; this is accomplished by sucking water into a diverticulum of the stomach. Many species of the Tetraodontidae, Triodontidae, and Diodontidae are further protected from predation by tetrodotoxin, a powerful neurotoxin concentrated in the animals' internal organs.

Tetraodontiforms have highly modified skeletons, with no nasal, parietal, infraorbital, or (usually) lower rib bones. The bones of the jaw are modified and fused into a sort of "beak"; visible sutures divide the beaks into "teeth". This is alluded to in their name, derived from the Greek words  meaning "four" and  meaning "tooth" and the Latin forma meaning "shape". Counting these teeth-like bones is a way of distinguishing similar families, for example, the Tetraodontidae  ("four-toothed"), Triodontidae ("three-toothed"), and Diodontidae ("two-toothed").

Their jaws are aided by powerful muscles, and many species also have pharyngeal teeth to further process prey items, because the Tetraodontiformes prey mostly on hard-shelled invertebrates, such as crustaceans and shellfish.

The Molidae are conspicuous even within this oddball order; they lack swim bladders and spines, and are propelled by their very tall dorsal and anal fins. The caudal peduncle is absent and the caudal fin is reduced to a stiff rudder-like structure. Molids are pelagic rather than reef-associated and feed on soft-bodied invertebrates, especially jellyfish.

Families

This cladogram of extant Tetraodontiformes is based on Santini et al., 2013.

Fossil families
 Superfamily †Plectocretacicoidea Tyler & Sorbini, 1996
 †Cretatriacanthidae Tyler & Sorbini, 1996
 †Plectocretacicidae Tyler & Sorbini, 1996
 †Protriacanthidae Tyler & Sorbini, 1996
 †Bolcabalistidae (e.g. Eospinus) Santini & Tyler, 2003
 †Eoplectidae
 †Moclaybalistidae Santini & Tyler, 2003
 †Spinacanthidae

Timeline of genera

References

 
 Tree of Life: Tetraodontiformes
 

 
Extant Cenomanian first appearances